Nikolai Vasilyevich Berg (Moscow, Russian Empire, - , Warsaw, Poland) was a Russian poet, journalist, translator and historian.

Biography
Nikolai Berg was born in Moscow. His father came from an old noble Livonian family. Nikolai studied first at the Tomsk regional college, then (in 1834-1838) at the Tambov and Moscow gymnasiums. In 1844 he enrolled into the Philological faculty of Moscow University but left an after a year.

In the early 1850s he joined the 'young faction' of Moskvityanin and, along with Boris Almazov, Evgeny Edelson, Lev Mei, Terty Filippov, and Apollon Grigoriev, became a member of what came to be known as the Ostrovsky circle. In 1853 he went to Sevastopol as a correspondent, and stayed there until the end of the siege, working as a translator at the headquarters of the Commander-in-Chief. He later published Notes on the Siege of Sevastopol (Moscow, 1858) and the Sevastopol Album, a collection of 37 drawings.

After the Crimean War ended, Berg went to the Caucasus where he witnessed the capture and arrest of Imam Shamil. He then travelled to Italy as a correspondent of The Russian Messenger to report on the progress of Giuseppe Garibaldi's army. Berg spent 1860-1862 travelling through Syria, Palestine and Egypt. As the January Uprising in Poland began he went to Warsaw as a correspondent for the Saint Petersburg magazine Vedomosti and stayed there for the rest of his life, teaching Russian language and literature at Warsaw University beginning in 1868, then editing the newspaper The Warsaw Diary (Varshavsky Dnevnik) from 1874 to 1877.

His major work, Notes on Polish Conspiracies and Uprisings came out in an unabridged version in 4 volumes in Poznań in 1884. In Russia, published in fragments in Russkiy Arkhiv (1870-1973) and Russkaya Starina (1879), it was banned. While in Poland Berg translated the works of Adam Mickiewicz (including Pan Tadeusz), and the works of poets from Bulgaria, Serbia, Slovakia, and Lithuania. Twelve of his Lithuanian Songs, originally included in the 1854 anthology Songs of Different Peoples, published in Moscow, came out in Vilno in 1921 as a separate edition.

References 

19th-century writers from the Russian Empire
Poets from the Russian Empire
Russian male poets
Essayists from the Russian Empire
Male essayists
Writers from Moscow
Historians from the Russian Empire
Journalists from the Russian Empire
Male writers from the Russian Empire
1823 births
1884 deaths
Translators from the Russian Empire
19th-century poets from the Russian Empire
19th-century journalists from the Russian Empire
Russian male journalists
19th-century translators from the Russian Empire
19th-century male writers from the Russian Empire
19th-century essayists
20th-century essayists
20th-century Russian male writers